Brodeck's Report is a 2007 novel by the French writer Philippe Claudel. The narrative investigates the murder of a mysterious man in an indefinite country just after the war. The book won the Prix Goncourt des Lycéens and the Independent Foreign Fiction Prize.
The location and the time are never explicit in the novel. However the parallel with World War II is obvious.

Reception
Helen Brown of The Daily Telegraph called the novel "deeply wise and classically beautiful". Brown wrote: "Brodeck's Report won the Prix Goncourt des Lycéens in the original French and John Cullen's English translation is as clear as a mountain stream. It is a modern masterpiece."

In Other Media

Manu Larcenet adapted it as a graphic novel of the same name in 2015.

See also
 2007 in literature
 French literature

References

2007 French novels
French-language novels
Novels by Philippe Claudel